Shanmugam Venkatesh (born 23 November 1978) is an Indian football coach and former professional footballer and currently, the assistant manager of East Bengal. He is an AFC A license coach.

Honours

Player
Salgaocar
 National Football League: 1998–99
 Federation Cup: 1997
 Durand Cup: 1999

East Bengal
 National Football League: 2002–03
 Durand Cup: 2002–03

Mahindra United
 National Football League: 2005–06
 Federation Cup: 2005
 Durand Cup: 2008

India
 SAFF Championship: 1997, 1999, 2005; third place: 2003

India U23
 LG Cup: 2002

Individual
 National Football League Best Player: 2001, 2003
 Karnataka Olympic Association Award: 2004
 AIFF Player of the Year: 2004–05

Manager
India U20
SAFF U-20 Championship: 2022

References

1978 births
Living people
Footballers from Bangalore
Indian footballers
Salgaocar FC players
Mahindra United FC players
East Bengal Club players
Mohun Bagan AC players
Pune FC players
Association football midfielders
I-League players
India international footballers
India youth international footballers
Footballers at the 1998 Asian Games
Footballers at the 2002 Asian Games
Asian Games competitors for India
Indian Arrows FC managers
Pailan Arrows managers
Indian football coaches
Association football coaches